Dunbar Theatre may refer to:

 Dunbar Theatre (Kansas), a movie theatre in Wichita, Kansas
 Dunbar Theatre (Philadelphia), a theatre and jazz venue in Philadelphia, Pennsylvania